Boco is a rural settlement in the Les Anglais commune in the Chardonnières Arrondissement, in the Sud department of Haiti.

See also
Chanterelle
Dernere Morne
Les Anglais (town)
Limo

References

Populated places in Sud (department)